
Gmina Otyń is an urban-rural gmina (administrative district) in Nowa Sól County, Lubusz Voivodeship, in western Poland.

Villages
Apart from the town of Otyń, Gmina Otyń contains the villages and settlements of Bobrowniki, Czasław, Konradowo, Ługi, Modrzyca, Niedoradz and Zakęcie.

Neighbouring gminas
Gmina Otyń is bordered by the town of Nowa Sól and by the gminas of Bojadła, Kożuchów, Nowa Sól, Zabór and Zielona Góra.

Twin towns – sister cities

Gmina Otyń is twinned with:
 Falkenberg, Germany
 Tsuman, Ukraine
 Zuberec, Slovakia

References

Otyn
Nowa Sól County